The following list is of outdoor brands that are owned by another entity.  The brands listed are those specific to the outdoor sporting goods industry.  Parent companies may own other brands that are not listed because those other brands are not marketed as outdoor sporting goods.  Companies and brands that are not subsidiaries of another company are not listed here.

Adidas Group (Germany)
Five Ten
Runtastic

Authentic Brands Group (USA)
Reebok

Canadian Tire (Canada)
Helly Hansen

OSSO Outdoor (Spain)
5dedos
OS2O

Amer Sports (China)
Arc'teryx
Armada
Atomic
DeMarini
ENVE Composites
Louisville Slugger
Peak Performance
Precor USA
Salomon Group
Sports Tracker
Suunto
Wilson Sporting Goods

ASICS (Japan)
Haglöfs

Clarus Corp (USA)
Black Diamond Equipment
Sierra Bullets
Pieps
Skin Nourishment

Callaway Golf Company (USA)
Jack Wolfskin

Cascade Designs (USA)
Mountain Safety Research
Platypus
SealLine
Therm-a-Rest
PackTowl

Columbia Sportswear (USA)
Columbia Sportswear
Columbia Montrail
Mountain Hardwear 
prAna
Sorel
OutDry 
Pacific Trail

Confluence Outdoor (USA)
Adventure Technology
Dagger Kayaks 
Harmony Gear
Mad River Canoe
Perception Kayaks
Wave Sport Kayaks
Wilderness Systems

Deckers Outdoor Corporation (USA)
UGG
Teva
Hoka One One
Sanuk
Koolaburra

Equip Outdoor Technologies (UK)
Lowe Alpine
Rab

Exxel Outdoors
Kelty
Master Sportsman
Sierra Designs
Slumberjack
Ultimate Direction
Tadpool
Wenzel
x2o

Fenix Outdoor AB (Sweden)
Brunton
Fjällräven
Royal Robbins Inc
Friluftsland AS
Hanwag
Naturkompaniet
Partioaitta
Primus
Tierra

Fiskars (Finland)
Gerber Legendary Blades

Helen of Troy Limited (USA)
Hydroflask
Osprey Packs

Newell Brands through Jarden  (USA) 
5150
Coleman Company, Inc.
Dana Design(now defunct)
Earth shoes
ExOfficio
Hawk Shoes
Liquid
Marmot

Johnson Outdoors (USA)
Cannon
Carlisle paddles
Eureka! Tent Company
Extrasport personal
Geonav

Jetboil
Lakemaster (Waypoint Technologies)
Minn Kota
Necky kayaks
Ocean Kayak
Old Town
Silva (brand name within USA and Canada, as separate from Silva Sweden AB)
Tech40

Katadyn (Switzerland)
Optimus International AB

Calida Group through Lafuma Group (France)
Eider
Killy
Lafuma
Le Chameau
Millet
Ober
Oxbow

Telemos Capital through Mammut Sports Group (Switzerland)
Ajungilak
Raichle
Toko

McNett (USA)
Aquamira
Gear Aid
M Essentials
McNett Tactical
Outgo

Regent, L.P. (USA)
Mavic

Schwan-Stabilo (Germany)
Deuter Sport
Ortovox
Maier Sports
Gonso

Terra Nova Equipment (UK)
Extremities

VAUDE (Germany)
Edelrid
Lucky
Markill
Red Chili

VF Corporation (USA)
Eagle Creek
Supreme
Eastpak
JanSport
Kipling
Napapijri
The North Face
SmartWool
The Timberland Company
Vans
Icebreaker
Altra Running

Vista Outdoor (USA)
Beestinger
Bell Sports
Blackburn
Blackhawk
Bollé
Bushnell
Butler Creek
CamelBak
Camp Chef
Champion
Federal
Giro
Hoppe's
Jimmy Styks
Primos
Serengeti
Tasco
Venor
Hevi-Shot
Remington Ammunition
QuietKat

Wolverine Worldwide (USA)
Chaco
Cushe
Merrell
Saucony
Sperry Top-Sider
Wolverine

See also
List of mountaineering equipment brands

References